Xinzha Road is the name of a station on Shanghai Metro Line 1, situated in Huangpu District within the inner ring-road of Shanghai.

The station is served by Shanghai bus lines 19, 36, 64, 136, 210, and 316 (night line).

References

Shanghai Metro stations in Huangpu District
Line 1, Shanghai Metro
Railway stations in China opened in 1995
Railway stations in Shanghai